Marcus Johansson (born 1 February 1994) is a Swedish footballer who plays for Assyriska IF as a forward.

References

External links

 (archive)

1994 births
Living people
Swedish footballers
Association football forwards
IFK Norrköping players
IF Sylvia players
Assyriska BK players
Superettan players
Allsvenskan players
Ettan Fotboll players